Saint Sinner may refer to:

Saint Sinner (comics), a comic book series published by Marvel Comics and created by Clive Barker
Saint Sinner (film), a 2002 television movie also created by Clive Barker